K2-28 is a metal rich M4-type main sequence star. One confirmed transiting exoplanet is known to orbit this star. There is another star 5.2 arcseconds to the north–east of K2-28 however this star has a different proper motion and is therefore physically unrelated and probably a background star.

Planetary system

Discovery
K2-28b was first noticed as a candidate extrasolar planet by Vanderburg et al. in 2016, who, in a search of 59,174 stars from the Kepler space telescope's first year of K2 observations, found 234 planetary candidates. Shortly thereafter the K2-ESPRINT Project confirmed that the candidate was a super-Earth sized planet in a close orbit around a red dwarf star.

Characteristics
K2-28b is a sub-Neptune sized planet orbiting its star in only 2.26 days. Despite its short orbital period the equilibrium temperature of the planet is a relatively low 500 Kelvin due to the low luminosity of the parent star. Because of the very small size of the parent star this planet is a particularly favorable target for transmission spectroscopy by the James Webb Space Telescope which should be able to determine if the atmosphere is cloudy or clear by observing roughly 5 transits. Among a group of small and cool planets orbiting relatively bright M-dwarfs its predicted secondary eclipse depth of 230 parts-per-million is second only to Gliese 1214 b.

References

External links
 The Extrasolar Planets Encyclopaedia  entry for K2-28b

Aquarius (constellation)
M-type main-sequence stars
Planetary systems with one confirmed planet
Planetary transit variables